Born Too Late was the first all doom metal festival to be held in the USA. It was held in Rochester, New York on April 26, 2003, at The Steel Music Hall. Born Too Late was originally a website dedicated to doom metal music created back in late 1997 by John Gallo of Orodruin, Crucifist, Blizaro.

A repeat festival was planned for August 1, 2009.

Lineup
 Penance
 The Gates of Slumber
 While Heaven Wept
 Revelation
 Soul Preacher
 Orodruin
 Pale Divine
 Unearthly Trance
 137

References

External links
   Official website
 

Heavy metal festivals in the United States
2003 in music
2003 in New York (state)
Doom metal
Music festivals established in 2003